The Confessions of a Woman (Italian: Le confessioni di una donna) is a 1928 Italian silent drama film directed by Amleto Palermi. The film relates a woman falling into high-class prostitution, and her eventual redemption. It is set in Palermo.

Cast
 Augusto Bandini 
 Maria Catalano 
 Gemma De Ferrari 
 Americo De Giorgio 
 Enrica Fantis 
 Pina Marini 
 Valentina Negri 
 Renato Nirvana
 Filippo Ricci 
 Luigi Serventi

References

Bibliography 
 Bayman, Louis. Directory of World Cinema: Italy. Intellect Books, 2011.

External links 
 

1928 films
1928 drama films
Italian drama films
Italian silent feature films
1920s Italian-language films
Films directed by Amleto Palermi
Films set in Palermo
Italian black-and-white films
Silent drama films
1920s Italian films